Lulu (or Lula) Belle Madison White (August 31, 1907 – July 6, 1957) was a teacher and civil rights activist in Texas during the 1940s and 1950s. In 1939, White was named as the president of the Houston chapter of the National Association for the Advancement of Colored People (NAACP) before becoming executive secretary of the branch in 1943. Under her leadership, the Houston chapter of the NAACP more than doubled in size from 1943 to 1948.

Early life
White was born in Elmo, Texas in 1907 to Samuel Henry Madison and Easter Madison. She was the tenth of their twelve children. Elmo was a predominately black community thirty-five miles north of Dallas. The region was noted for its especially racist customs, and this helped incite White's to become a civil rights activist. Her father helped encourage White to receive an education.

Career
In 1923, White enrolled at Butler College in Tyler, Texas, for a year before transferring to Prairie View College (now Prairie View A&M University) in Hempstead, Texas. Here, she received a bachelor's degree in English in 1928. Following graduation, White married Julius White, a Houston businessman and NAACP member who had been involved in voting rights cases. Because White was unable to find a job in Houston due to her husband's connection with the Civil Rights Movement, White took a teaching position in Lufkin, Texas, where she taught English and physical education. After nine years of teaching, White resigned to become a full-time activist with the NAACP. White soon became the first woman to become a full-time salaried executive secretary of a local chapter of the NAACP.

In 1949, White stepped down from executive secretary of the Houston branch after disagreements with Carter Wesley over the issue of racial integration. However, she remained the Director of State Branches. White led the movement for the Houston City Council to pass an ordinance that would allow city hospitals to employ black doctors, helped organize protests for African-American women to be able to try on clothes in department stores, and worked to integrate taxi companies. She went on to be a field worker for the national branch of the NAACP, and later the national branch of the NAACP went on to create a Lulu White Freedom Fund in her honor. She remained politically active until her death, which was caused by a heart ailment on July 6, 1957.

Voting Rights and Economic Equality
White took many initiatives to help African Americans gain the right to vote. She played a role in the elimination of the White primaries in 1943, which stated that only whites were able to vote in Democratic Party party primaries.

White thought that it was essential for African Americans to have equal civil liberties and equal economic opportunities. In promoting this idea, she encouraged African Americans to seek employment opportunities at businesses that were traditionally regarded as white establishments. While White herself adopted this notion of equal employment opportunity, she was frequently refused to been seen by management and was turned away. To highlight the inequality of employment opportunities among whites and African Americans, she organized group demonstrations condemning managers of this behavior. As a consequence of this, White was sometimes labeled a communist.

Legacy
White remained active as an activist in the black community until her death on July 6, 1957. It is suspected that she died of heart disease and is currently buried in Paradise South in Houston, Texas. In the week before her death, the NAACP created the Lulu White Freedom Fund in her honor.

References 

1907 births
NAACP activists
People from Elmo, Texas
Schoolteachers from Texas
Prairie View A&M University alumni
1957 deaths
20th-century American women educators
20th-century American educators